Kito or Kitō may refer to:

Kitō (surname), a Japanese surname
Kitō-ryū, a Japanese martial art
Kito, Tokushima, a former village in Naka District, Tokushima Prefecture, Japan
Kito (Tonga), an island of Tonga
KITO-FM, a radio station in Vinita, Oklahoma, United States

People with the given name
Kito (musician), Australian DJ
Kito Lorenc (1938–2017), German writer, poet and translator
Kito Poblah (born 1987), Canadian football player